Czesław Stanjek (born 29 November 1952) is a Polish wrestler. He competed in the men's Greco-Roman 52 kg at the 1976 Summer Olympics.

References

1952 births
Living people
Polish male sport wrestlers
Olympic wrestlers of Poland
Wrestlers at the 1976 Summer Olympics
Sportspeople from Ruda Śląska